Carlos Alberto Mijangos Castro (born 19 August 1951) is a Guatemalan professional football coach and former midfielder.

Club career
Nicknamed "El Comanche", Mijangos played for locals sides Juventud Retalteca, Club Xelajú MC, Deportivo Zacapa, C.S.D. Municipal and Cobán Imperial.

He also played in the 1970s in El Salvador for Platense and Chalatenango, and won promotion with the latter to the Primera División de Fútbol de El Salvador in 1979.

In Honduras he played for F.C. Motagua and in the United States for Tulsa Roughnecks.

In 1982, he almost lost a leg due to infection.

Managerial career
After retiring, he went into management and managed Aurora, Escuintla, Xelajú, Juventud Retalteca, Sacachispas, Coatepeque, Ayutla, C.D. Jalapa, Chimaltenango, San Marcos, Universidad, Deportivo Malacateco and Rosario.

In 2004, he was in charge of Tipografía Nacional in Guatemala's third division.

He then returned in 2005 to El Salvador to coach Chalatenango where he was dismissed in September 2005 and later became in charge of Guatemala Second Division side Deportivo San Pedro.

In December 2009 joined Atlético Balboa.

In 2017, he returned to Chalatenango, but, problems with the team's directive caused that Mijangos was not confirmed until April 8.

References

1951 births
Living people
Sportspeople from Guatemala City
Guatemalan footballers
Guatemalan expatriate footballers
Guatemala international footballers
Deportivo Zacapa players
C.D. Chalatenango footballers
C.S.D. Municipal players
F.C. Motagua players
Xelajú MC players
Cobán Imperial players
Expatriate footballers in El Salvador
Expatriate football managers in El Salvador
Expatriate footballers in Honduras
Liga Nacional de Fútbol Profesional de Honduras players
Expatriate soccer players in the United States
Guatemalan football managers
C.D. Águila managers
Aurora F.C. managers
Association football midfielders
Guatemalan expatriate sportspeople in El Salvador
Guatemalan expatriate sportspeople in Honduras
Guatemalan expatriate sportspeople in the United States